The Pawtucket Slaters were a minor-league baseball team based in Pawtucket, Rhode Island. From 1946 through 1949, the team played its games at McCoy Stadium as a member of the class-B New England League, and was affiliated with the Boston Braves of the National League. The Slaters made the league playoffs in each season of their four-year existence; in each case, they were eliminated in the first round, including three consecutive playoff losses at the hands of the eventual league champion Nashua Dodgers.

The Slaters were preceded in the New England League by the Pawtucket Maroons (1894–1896), Pawtucket Phenoms (1897) and Pawtucket Tigers (1898) and Pawtucket Colts.

Pawtucket led the New England League in attendance in 1947. The team disbanded with the league after the 1949 season.

Season-by-season record

Notable alumni
 
Dave Cole
George Crowe
Ernie Johnson
Don Liddle
Johnny Logan
Normie Roy
Chuck Tanner
Pete Whisenant

References 

David Borges, The Pawtucket Red Sox (Images of Baseball). Arcadia Publications, 2002.

External links
"New England League 1946–1949"

Defunct minor league baseball teams
Professional baseball teams in Rhode Island
Pawtucket, Rhode Island
Boston Braves minor league affiliates
Defunct baseball teams in Rhode Island
Baseball teams established in 1946
Baseball teams disestablished in 1949
1946 establishments in Rhode Island
1949 disestablishments in Rhode Island